V4046 Sagittarii is a young binary consisting of two K-type main-sequence stars. The two stars are about 271 light-years (83 parsecs) away from the Earth. The two stars orbit each other every 2.42 days on a circular orbit.

V4046 Sagittarii is surrounded by a massive protoplanetary disk. The disk has a radius of about 370 astronomical units (au) with about 40 Earth masses of dust in the disk. There are two bright inner rings at 14 and 25 au from the center, respectively. V4046 Sagittarii is one of four pre-main-sequence star systems within 100 parsecs with protoplanetary disks, the others being TW Hydrae, HD 141569, and 49 Ceti. The two stars are still accreting matter from the disk, and gas giant planets may be forming in the disk as well.

The red dwarf GSC 07396-00759 is separated about 2.82″ from V4046 Sagittarii. Since it has a similar motion throughout space with V4046 Sagittarii, GSC 07396-00759 is assumed to be gravitationally bound (although weakly) to V4046 Sagittarii. The two systems are separated by at least 12,350 astronomical units away, and the orbital period would be on the order of 100,000 years. GSC 07396-00759 itself has an edge-on debris disk with a radius of 70 au, and may be a binary as well, making V4046 Sagittarii a potentially quadruple system.

See also 
 UX Tauri
 HD 98800
 T Tauri

References

External links 
 
 

T Tauri stars
Sagittarius (constellation)
Hypothetical planetary systems
K-type main-sequence stars
319139
Sagittarii, V4046
Spectroscopic binaries
Durchmusterung objects